Wolbae Station is an underground station of Line 1 of the Daegu Metro located to Dalseo-gu in Daegu, South Korea. It is located in the building of Samhyun Medical Center near exit 3 of the station. There is a station in front of Daegu Wolbae Elementary School, a short distance from the range, and all four exits are located in the direction of the city. As many residential districts are currently being developed around, the trend is gradually increasing the number of visitors. There is an escalator at exit 1 and an elevator at exits 3 and 4. This station is the lowest depth of all stations on Daegu Metro Line 1 (13.7m).

Station layout

External links

 Cyber station information from Daegu Metropolitan Transit Corporation

Dalseo District
Railway stations opened in 1997
Daegu Metro stations